The 2015–16 Croatian Second Football League (also known as Druga HNL or 2. HNL) is the 25th season of the Croatian Second Football League, the second level football competition for men's association football teams in Croatia, since its establishment in 1992. The season started on 14 August 2015 and will end on 21 May 2016.

The league is contested by twelve teams and played in a triple round robin format, with each team playing every other team three times over 33 rounds. At the end of the previous season Inter Zaprešić were promoted, returning to the top flight after two seasons, while Bistra were relegated in their début season. Pomorac were also relegated due to financial insolvency. Bistra and Pomorac were replaced by Dinamo II and Šibenik, after winning their respective Croatian Third Football League divisions.

Teams
On 20 April 2015, Croatian Football Federation announced that the first stage of licensing procedure for 2015–16 season was completed. For the 2015–16 Druga HNL, only nine clubs were issued a second level license: Dinamo II, Gorica, Hajduk Split II, Imotski, Istra 1961, Mosor, Rijeka II, Rudeš and Sesvete. In the second stage of licensing procedure clubs that were not licensed in the first round appealed the decision. On 20 May 2015, all remaining Druga HNL were granted second division license, along with third level clubs Šibenik and Dinamo II.

Stadia and locations

Managerial changes

League table

Results

Matches 1–22

Matches 23–33

Top scorers
As of 21 May 2016; Source: Druga-HNL.com

See also
2015–16 Croatian Football Cup
2015–16 Croatian First Football League
2015–16 Croatian Third Football League

References

External links
Official website  

2015-16
Cro
2